Proc may refer to:

 Proč, a village in eastern Slovakia
 Proč?, a 1987 Czech film
 procfs or proc filesystem, a special file system (typically mounted to ) in Unix-like operating systems for  accessing process information
 Protein C (PROC)
 Proc, a term in video game terminology
 Procedures or process, in the programming language ALGOL 68
 People's Republic of China, the formal name of China
 the official acronym for the Canadian House of Commons Standing Committee on Procedure and House Affairs 
 People's Republic of the Congo